Walter Kappacher (born 24 October 1938 in Salzburg) is an Austrian writer. In 2009 he was awarded the Georg Büchner Prize for his literary oeuvre.

References

1938 births
Georg Büchner Prize winners
Living people